The 14th Bahamian Parliament is the current sitting of the Parliament of the Bahamas. It was elected in the 2021 Bahamian general election.

Members

MPs

References 

Sittings of the Bahamian Parliament
2020s establishments in the Caribbean
Bahamas